Aeginetia flava is a plant in the broomrape family Orobanchaceae, native to Thailand. The specific epithet  is from the Latin meaning "yellow" or "golden yellow", referring to the flowers.

Description
The flowers, solitary on the stem, feature bright yellow petals.

Distribution and habitat
Aeginetia flava is endemic to Thailand, where it is confined to Khao Soi Dao Wildlife Sanctuary. In common with other species of its genus, Aeginetia flava is parasitic. In this population, it attaches to the roots of a Strobilanthes species.

References

Orobanchaceae
Endemic flora of Thailand
Plants described in 2012